The men's shot put at the 2016 IAAF World Indoor Championships took place on March 18, 2016.

While Andrei Gag and Filip Mihaljevic were the leaders after the first round, in the second round Tomas Walsh took the lead.  Any one of his remaining five throws would have won the competition, with a best of 21.78 on his final attempt.  Gag finished second with his first round attempt of 20.89, while Mihaljevic's personal best 20.87 in round 5 saw him finish third.

Results
The final was started at 18.45.

References

Shot put
Shot put at the World Athletics Indoor Championships